The 1965 Hove by-election was a parliamentary by-election for the British House of Commons constituency of Hove held on 22 July 1965.

Vacancy
The by-election was caused by the resignation of Conservative MP Anthony Marlowe. Marlowe had had a heart attack in June 1965. He had been MP here since winning the seat in 1950.

Election history
Hove had been won by the Conservatives at every election since 1950 when the seat was created. The result at the last General election was as follows;

Candidates
The Conservatives selected 44-year-old former MP Martin Maddan. He had sat for Hitchin, Hertfordshire from 1955-64. He had been defeated at the general election the previous year.
Labour re-selected 50-year-old Thomas James Marsh who had stood here at the previous general election when he came second. Marsh was a company secretary and accountant. He had been educated at Worthing High School, West Sussex. He had been a member of Southwick Urban Council since 1948 and of West Sussex County Council from 1952–55 and since 1958. He was a member of the executive committee of the Southern Regional Labour Party.
The Liberals selected 43-year-old Oliver Moxon. He had been educated at Gresham's School, Holt. He was an author who was standing for parliament for the first time. The Liberals had not fielded a candidate since 1950 when their candidate polled just 9.7%. Moxon was the brother of actor Timothy Moxon with whom, after the war, he founded the New Torch Theatre in London.
An Independent candidate, 64-year-old Max Cossman, put himself forward. He was a Company secretary who had been raised in Austria where he became a graduate in law and economics at Vienna University.

Campaign

Result
It was won by the Conservatives' Martin Maddan. There was a 6.2% swing against the Conservatives;

Aftermath
The result at the 1966 general election;

Moxon contested Brighton Kemptown in 1970 Sidcup, against Prime Minister Edward Heath, before moving to Jamaica. Marsh did not stand again.

References

See also
 List of United Kingdom by-elections
 

1965 elections in the United Kingdom
1965 in England
20th century in Sussex
Politics of Brighton and Hove
By-elections to the Parliament of the United Kingdom in East Sussex constituencies